Eckehard Mayer (born 1946) is a German composer.

Career 
Born in Hainsberg, Mayer was a member of the Dresdner Kreuzchor from 1957 to 1965. He then studied music in Leipzig.  From 1970 to 1982 he worked at various theatres as repétiteur and conductor (among others at the Volkstheater Rostock, and the Semperoper). From 1982 to 2011 he worked at the Staatsschauspiel Dresden as a composer, conductor and pianist, with interruptions as director of acting music. He was awarded the Carl Maria von Weber Prize for composition in 1976 and 1984. His opera Sansibar was premiered at the Schwetzingen Festival in 1994.

Stage works 
 Ballade für Nico und Maria, 1978, chamber opera after M. Richter
 Die Weise von Liebe und Tod, (see The Love and Death of Cornet Christopher Rilke) 1984, ballet after Rainer Maria Rilke
 Der goldene Topf, 1989, opera after E.T.A. Hoffmann, Semperoper Dresden
 Sansibar, 1994, opera after Alfred Andersch, Schwetzingen Festival / Bavarian State Opera
 Das Treffen in Teltge, 2000, opera after Günter Grass, premiered on 6 March 2005 Theater Dortmund
 Passage, 2005, opera after C. Hein, premiered on 4 Mai 2006 Landesbühnen Sachsen, Synagoge Dresden

Writing 

References

External links 
 
 

1946 births
20th-century classical pianists
20th-century German conductors (music)
20th-century German composers
20th-century German writers
20th-century German male musicians
21st-century classical pianists
21st-century German conductors (music)
21st-century German composers
21st-century German writers
21st-century German male musicians
German classical pianists
Male classical pianists
German male conductors (music)
German male pianists
German opera composers
Living people
Male opera composers
People from Freital